Custom House Maritime Museum may refer to:

 United States Customhouse (Newburyport, Massachusetts)
 New London Customhouse, in Connecticut

Maritime museums in Massachusetts